The Army Black Knights men's basketball team represents the United States Military Academy in National Collegiate Athletic Association (NCAA) Division I college basketball. Army currently competes as a member of the Patriot League and plays its home games at Christl Arena in West Point, New York.

History
Bob Knight, the one-time winningest men's basketball coach in NCAA history, began his head coaching career at Army from 1965 to 1971 before moving on to Indiana. One of Knight's players at Army was Mike Krzyzewski, who later was head coach at Army before moving on to Duke and becoming the winningest men's basketball coach in NCAA Division I history.

Since its inception in 1903, Army retrospectively has been awarded two national championships, has made eight NIT appearances, has refused two NCAA tournament invitations, in 1944 and 1968, and has an overall 49.7% winning percentage. The Black Knights are one of only four original Division I teams in history to have never participated in the NCAA Division I men's basketball tournament and one of 35 eligible teams. Army shares this distinction with William & Mary, The Citadel, and St. Francis Brooklyn. However, the Black Knights have played in the National Invitational Tournament eight times, and were retroactively named national champions by Premo-Porretta for 1923 and by the Helms Athletic Foundation for 1944, when they went undefeated (15–0), but declined an invitation to the NCAA tournament due to World War II.  The 1944 squad was captained by Edward C. Christl, who earned a posthumous Distinguished Service Cross during World War II and for whom the Black Knights' home arena is named. The Black Knights played in the 2016 edition of the CollegeInsider.com Postseason Tournament (CIT), their first appearance in a postseason tournament in 38 years, losing to NJIT in the first round. The Black Knights did receive an NCAA Tournament invite in 1968, but head coach Bob Knight refused the bid, claiming they had a better chance to win the NIT. They would go on to lose their first game of the NIT to Notre Dame.

Seasons

In 119 seasons, the Black Knights have a record of 1262–1276.

Postseason results

National Invitation tournament
The Black Knights have appeared in the National Invitation Tournament (NIT) eight times. Their combined record is 13–10.

CollegeInsider.com tournament
The Black Knights have appeared in one CollegeInsider.com Postseason Tournament (CIT). Their record is 0–1.

CBI results
The Black Knights have appeared in one College Basketball Invitational (CBI). Their record is 0–1.

Head coaches

All-Americans

The following Army players were named NCAA Men's Basketball All-Americans:

William Copthorne – 1910 (Helms Athletic Foundation)
William Roberts – 1913 (Helms Athletic Foundation)
Elmer Oliphant – 1915 (Helms Athletic Foundation)
Gene Vidal – 1918 (Helms Athletic Foundation)
Harry Wilson – 1927 (Helms Athletic Foundation)
Dale Hall – 1944 (Consensus Second Team), 1945 (Consensus Second Team)
Gary Winton – 1977 (AP Honorable Mention), 1978 (AP Honorable Mention)
Kevin Houston – 1987 (NABC Third Team)

Academic All-Americans

The following Army players were named Academic All-America:

Mike Silliman – 1964
John Ritch – 1965
Robert Sherwin – 1972, 1973
Steve Rothert – 1989

Basketball Hall of Fame

The following Army players and coaches have been inducted into the Naismith Memorial Basketball Hall of Fame:

Ernest Blood – 1960, former coach
John Roosma – 1961, former player
Elmer Ripley – 1972, former coach, inducted as a contributor
Harry A. Fisher – 1973, former coach, inducted as a contributor
Bob Knight – 1991, former coach
Mike Krzyzewski – 2001, former coach and player, inducted as a coach

Major awards

Eastern Collegiate Athletic Conference Award: Outstanding Scholar-Athlete of the Year
John Ritch – 1965

Frances Pomeroy Naismith Award
Robert Sherwin – 1973

Haggerty Award
Kevin Houston – 1987

Metro Atlantic Athletic Conference Men's Basketball Player of the Year
Randy Cozzens – 1985
Kevin Houston – 1987

Metro Atlantic Athletic Conference Men's Basketball Coach of the Year
Les Wothke – 1985

Patriot League Men's Basketball Coach of the Year
Pat Harris – 2001–02
Zach Spiker – 2012–13

Patriot League Men's Basketball Rookie of the Year
David Ardayfio – 1990–91
Alex Morris – 1992–93
Kyle Wilson – 2012–13

Patriot League Men's Basketball Defensive Player of the Year
Marcus Nelson – 2008–09
Josh Caldwell - 2020-21
Josh Caldwell - 2021-22

References

External links